Asata was a Nubian queen with the Egyptian titles king's wife and Person of Egypt. She was perhaps the wife of king Aspelta. However, this relationship is only a guess. Asata is mainly known from her burial at Nuri (Nuri 42).
Her burial consisted of a pyramid with a small chapel in front of it. The pyramid was found heavily destroyed. The chapels was totally gone. There is a staircase going down to two burial chambers that were found looted, but still contained a high number of objects, including the heart scarab of the queen, at least 270 shabtis (providing her name and title), several stone vessels, amulets and other fragments that must have covered the mummy.

References 

7th-century BC women
6th-century BC women
Queens of Kush